Barnstable Academy is a university preparatory private school serving students in sixth through twelfth grades in Oakland, New Jersey in Bergen County, New Jersey, United States. The school was founded in 1978. The school is accredited by AdvancED.

As of the 2019–20 school year, the school had an enrollment of 95 students and 18.4 classroom teachers (on an FTE basis), for a student–teacher ratio of 5.2:1. The school's student body was 84.2% (80) White, 5.3% (5) Asian, 5.3% (5) two or more races, 4.2% (4) Black and 1.1% (1) Hispanic.

References

External links
 Barnstable Academy

Schools in Oakland, New Jersey
Private middle schools in New Jersey
Private high schools in Bergen County, New Jersey
1978 establishments in New Jersey
Educational institutions established in 1978